Chan Hao-ching and Chan Yung-jan were the defending champions, but Chan Hao-ching chose to compete in Budapest. Chan Yung-jan paired up with Casey Dellacqua, but lost in the quarterfinals to Chan Chin-wei and Hsu Wen-hsin.

Jessica Pegula and Zheng Saisai later defeated Chan and Hsu in the final, 6–4, 3–6, [10–4].

Seeds

Draw

References 
 Draw

Kangaroo Cup - Doubles
2012 in Japanese tennis
Kangaroo Cup